HMS Saga was a S-class submarine of the third batch built for the Royal Navy during World War II. She survived the war and was sold to Portugal.

Design and description
The last 17 boats of the third batch were significantly modified from the earlier boats. They had a stronger hull, carried more fuel and their armament was revised. They displaced  on the surface and  submerged. The S-class submarines had a crew of 48 officers and ratings.

For surface running, the boats were powered by two  diesel engines, each driving one propeller shaft. When submerged each propeller was driven by a  electric motor. They could reach  on the surface and  underwater.

Saga was armed with six 21 inch (533 mm) torpedo tubes in the bow. She carried six reload torpedoes for a grand total of a dozen torpedoes. Twelve mines could be carried in lieu of the torpedoes. The boat was also equipped with a 4-inch (102 mm) deck gun.

Construction and career
HMS Saga built by Cammell Laird and launched on 14 March 1945. Thus far she has been the only ship of the Royal Navy to bear the name Saga, after the Norse Sagas. Built as the Second World War was drawing to a close, she did not see much action. On 10 February 1946 Saga collided with, and sank, the trawler Girl Lena in the English Channel. Saga was sold to the Portuguese Navy in 1948 and renamed NRP Náutilo.

Notes

References
 
  
 
 
 

 

British S-class submarines (1931)
Ships built on the River Mersey
1945 ships
World War II submarines of the United Kingdom
Royal Navy ship names
British S-class submarines (1931) of the Portuguese Navy
Maritime incidents in 1946